Pakistan Handball Federation (PHF) is the administrative and controlling body for handball and beach handball in Islamic Republic of Pakistan. PHF is an affiliated member of the Asian Handball Federation (AHF) and the International Handball Federation (IHF).

History
In Pakistan, sport of handball was introduced by Muhammad Shafiq in 1984 at University of Agriculture, Faisalabad, which is hub of handball in Pakistan since then. During the 20th National Games of Pakistan which was staged in Faisalabad, an exhibition match between National Athletics & Fitness Club and University of Agriculture, Faisalabad was played at Iqbal Stadium, Faisalabad. Since then, handball has been gradually developing and gaining popularity. PHF was formed in April 1985 with Ahsan Alam as President and Muhammad Shafiq as secretary general.

Presidents

Secretary Generals

 Muhammad Fahim died in office on 9 January 2006.

Executive committee

See also
 Pakistan men's national handball team
 Pakistan national beach handball team

References

External links
 Official website  
 Pakistan at the IHF website
 Pakistan at the AHF website
 Pakistan at the POA website

Handball governing bodies
Sports governing bodies in Pakistan
Sports organizations established in 1985
1985 establishments in Pakistan
Asian Handball Federation